Monde Lobese is a South African naval officer, serving as Chief of the South African Navy.

Military career

He left South Africa in 1985 to join Umkhonto We Sizwe and underwent training in Germany before being selected for naval training in the Soviet Union. He integrated into the South African Navy in 1994.

In 2009, he was appointed Director Fleet Logistics at Fleet Command as a Rear Admiral (junior grade). In 2015 he joined Joint Operations as Director Operations Support where he stayed until being appointed Deputy Chief of the Navy in September 2021 and served as acting Chief after the retirement of Vice Admiral Samuel Hlongwane. He was appointed Chief of the Navy from 1 November 2022.

Awards and decorations

References

South African admirals
Living people
Chiefs of the South African Navy
Year of birth missing (living people)